Rubukona is a genus of moths in the family Sesiidae.

Species
Rubukona cuprescens (Hampson, 1919)
Rubukona svetlanae Fischer, 2007

References

Sesiidae